Than Oo is a prominent Burmese educator and Ministry of Education (MOE) official.

His mother was mentally ill, while his father and elder brother died when Than Oo was young. Than Oo studied at Rangoon University, obtaining a Bachelor of Arts in education. He continued his study at the University of Hawaii, through a scholarship with the East-West Center, and obtained a Master of Education in 1963.

Than Oo subsequently returned to Burma. He was appointed Assistant Administration Officer of Schools at the Directorate of Education, and went on to become a Principal of the Bassein Teacher Training School. In 1965, he was appointed as the Assistant Education Research Officer under the Ministry of Education's Burma Education Research Bureau. There, he began a nationwide mass literacy movement that increased Burma's literacy rate to 78.6% by 1988, and reformed the Burmese language pedagogy.

In 1977, he was appointed to Director-General of the MOE's Department of Basic Education, becoming an influential education advisor.

Current projects

Than Oo is the chairman of the Myanmar Academy of Arts and Science. He also currently serves on the academic advisory board of the Myanmar Education Promotion Implementation Committee. He also serves as the chairman for the Myanmar Literacy Resource Centre.

Honorary recognition
On 16 May 2015, the University of Hawaii awarded him an Honorary Doctorate of Humane Letters.

References

1928 births
People from Bago Region
Burmese educators
Burmese civil servants
University of Hawaiʻi alumni
University of Yangon alumni
Living people